Chicontepec is a municipality in Veracruz, Mexico. It is located in the north of the State of Veracruz.

The municipality of Chicontepec is delimited to the north by Tantoyuca and Ixcatepec, to the east by Temapache and Tepetzintla, to the south by Ixhuatlán de Madero, and to the west by Hidalgo.

It produces principally maize, beans and oranges.

The celebration in honor of Santiago Apóstol, Patron of Chicontepec, takes place in July.

The weather in Chicontepec is very warm all year round with rain in summer.

Many inhabitants still speak the Nahuatl language and practice indigenous customs.

References

External links
  Municipal Official webpage
  Municipal Official Information

Municipalities of Veracruz